Attila Császár (21 December 1958 – 3 May 2017) was a Hungarian sprint kayaker who competed in the early 1980s. He won a bronze medal in the K-4 500 m event at the 1983 ICF Kayak Sprint World Championships in Tampere.

References

Sources

1958 births
2017 deaths
Hungarian male canoeists
ICF Canoe Sprint World Championships medalists in kayak
Place of death missing
20th-century Hungarian people
People from Tata, Hungary
Sportspeople from Komárom-Esztergom County